Real Momentum is the name of a documentary series on the Logo network. 

Documentaries in the Real Momentum series vary in length and style, and are mix of original Logo-produced documentaries, co-productions, and acquired documentaries. 

The series launched with the channel on June 30, 2005; the first program to broadcast on the channel was the Logo-produced Real Momentum documentary titled The Evolution Will Be Televised, which followed the history of LGBT images in the media.

In addition to broadcasting on the Logo channel, the Real Momentum documentary series broadcasts on the Logo On Demand service, on LOGOonline.com, and can be purchased through download to own services such as iTunes.

Season One Documentaries
 The Evolution Will Be Televised [6/30/2005]
 Go Dragons! A Rugby Story [7/9/2005]
 Ruthie and Connie: Every Room in the House [7/16/2005]
 Trembling Before G-d [7/23/2005]
 Gidyup! On the Rodeo Circuit [7/30/2005]
 Latino Beginnings  [8/6/2005]
 The Brandon Teena Story
 Paragraph 175
 Forbidden Love, The Unashamed Stories of Lesbian Lives
 Raising Teens
 Farm Family: In Search of Gay Life in Rural America
 The Eyes of Tammy Faye
 Hip Hop Homos
 Daddy and Papa
 The Celluloid Closet
 Out in Nature: Homosexual Behaviour in the Animal Kingdom
 The Two Cubas [10/29/2005]
 Butch Mystique
 Power Lesbians
 The Cockettes

Season Two Documentaries
 Curl Girls [1/2/2006]
 Bachelor Farmer
 Let's Get Frank
 Paris Is Burning
 Beautiful Daughters [2/11/2006]
 The Aggressives
 100% Woman
 The Opposite Sex: Rene's Story
 The Opposite Sex: Jamie's Story
 When Ocean Meets Sky
 Elephant In The Room [6/23/2006]
 Jumpin' the Broom
 No Dumb Questions
 Same Sex America
 Gender Rebel
 Little Man
 Pick Up the Mic
 The Lost Tribe
 Gay Siblings [11/19/2006]

Season Three Documentaries
 Southern Comfort
 Love Lessons [2/4/2007]
 Reporter Zero
 For the Love of Dolly
 Freddie Mercury: Magic Remixed

Season Four Documentaries
 Small Town Gay Bar
 Camp Out
 On The Downlow
 The Believers
 Real Momentum Shorts
 Bisexual Girls 
 Rock the Boat
 My Mums Used to Be Men

External links
Official Series Page

2005 American television series debuts
2008 American television series endings
2000s American documentary television series
2000s American LGBT-related television series
Documentaries about LGBT topics